Ghunghat ("Face-veil") is a 1962 Pakistani musical suspense thriller film  directed by Khawaja Khurshid Anwar, who also wrote screenplay and composed the music of the film. The main concept was derived from Ghulam Mohammad's short story Dosheeza. The film features Nayyar Sultana and Santosh Kumar as leads with Neelo, Laila, Ghulam Mohammad and Bibbo in supporting roles.

The film was selected as the Pakistani entry for the Best Foreign Language Film at the 36th Academy Awards, but was not accepted as a nominee. This film won four awards at the 1962 Nigar Awards ceremony held in Pakistan, including Best Actor for Kumar amd Best Music.

The film was featured in British Film Institute's critics and users' polls of "Top ten Pakistani films of all times". In November 2015, it was screened at the Lok Virsa Museum to keep the historical records of the feature films.

Plot 
Shahid is deceived by his newly married bride Usha Rani, who elopes on their wedding night which disturbs him badly. He turns alcoholic and is left all alone after this tragic incident. To move on, he decides to visit a hill station with his friend so that he could feel better. However, on reaching there, he is haunted by the spirit of Usha Rani there.

Cast
 Santosh Kumar as Shahid
 Nayyar Sultana as Usha Rani
 Laila
 Neelo
 A. Shah Shikarpuri
 Agha Talish
 Ghulam Mohammad

Soundtrack

Awards
Ghunghat (1962 film) won a total of 4 following Nigar Awards:
Nigar Award for Best Actor (1962)
Nigar Award for Best Music (1962)
Nigar Award for Best Cameraman (1962)
Nigar Award for Best Editing (1962)

See also
List of submissions to the 36th Academy Awards for Best Foreign Language Film
List of Pakistani submissions for the Academy Award for Best Foreign Language Film

References

External links

1962 films
Urdu-language Pakistani films
1960s Urdu-language films
1962 musical films
Films directed by Khwaja Khurshid Anwar
Films scored by Khurshid Anwar
Nigar Award winners
Pakistani musical drama films
Pakistani black-and-white films